Harold Mansfield Lane (13 March 1895 – 24 June 1972) was a British rower who competed in the 1928 Summer Olympics.

Lane was a member of Thames Rowing Club In 1928 he was a member of the Thames eight which won the Grand Challenge Cup at Henley Royal Regatta. The crew then represented Great Britain rowing at the 1928 Summer Olympics and won the silver medal.

References

External links
 profile

1895 births
1972 deaths
British male rowers
Olympic rowers of Great Britain
Rowers at the 1928 Summer Olympics
Olympic silver medallists for Great Britain
Olympic medalists in rowing
Medalists at the 1928 Summer Olympics